Danielle de March-Ronco (born 6 August 1939 in Lérouville) is a French politician and communist, who formerly served as vice-president of the European Parliament.

Biography 
de March is the daughter of a stonemason and an office worker. After earning her national diploma, she worked for the URSSAF.

She became active in politics and trade unionism as a member of the General Confederation of Labour and the French Communist Party. In 1979, she was elected to the European Parliament with the Communist Party. She would be named vice-president of the legislature during her first mandate. She was re-elected in 1984, and would continue to serve as an MEP until 1989. 

In 1979, she was the only women to sit on the Var council. She was also elected a city councillor in Toulon in 1989 and 1995. 

In February 2004, she became president of the Amicale des vétérans communistes varois.

Bibliography 

 Cet homme face au soleil, Manugraph, 2005
 Les mots de flamme, Transbordeurs, 2008
 L’empreinte des saisons, Éditions du Losange, 2011
 Les cahiers de Nina, Éditions du Losange, 2015
 Mon Toulon, nos résistances, Éditions du Losange, 2017

References 

20th-century French women politicians
MEPs for France 1984–1989
MEPs for France 1979–1984
French Communist Party MEPs
1939 births
Living people